The 2006 Asian Men’s Club Volleyball Championship was the 7th staging of the AVC Club Championships. The tournament was held in Hanoi, Vietnam. Paykan of Iran won the tournament after beating Rahat CSKA of Kazakhstan.

Preliminary round

Pool A

|}

|}

Pool B

|}

|}

Classification 9th–10th

|}

Classification 5th–8th

Semifinals

|}

7th place

|}

5th place

|}

Final round

Semifinals

|}

3rd place

|}

Final

|}

Final standing

Awards
MVP:  Mohammad Soleimani (Paykan)
Best Scorer:  Daisaku Nishino (Sakai)
Best Server:  Mohammad Mohammadkazem (Paykan)
Best Spiker:  Fang Yingchao (Shanghai)
Best Blocker:  Mohammad Mansouri (Paykan)
Best Libero:  Farhad Zarif (Paykan)
Best Setter:  He Jiong (Shanghai)
Best Digger:  Srophum Supachai (Army)

References
Asian Volleyball Confederation
  Results

A
International volleyball competitions hosted by Vietnam
Asian Mens Club Volleyball Championship, 2006